Carlos Eduardo Giménez Colmenares is a Venezuelan politician and was the governor of Yaracuy from 2004 to 2008. He was impeached in June 2008 by the Supreme Tribunal of Justice, and replaced by Álex Sánchez.

Biography
Carlos Eduardo Giménez Colmenares was born in the Independencia Municipality, located in the Yaracuy State on April 9, 1959.  He would go on to study law at the Universidad Fermin Toro in Barquisimeto in the Lara State.  He was elected to the Yaracuy Legislative Assembly in 1993 where he would serve until 1996, when he was elected mayor of Independencia Municipality.  In 1998, he became vice-president of the Bolivarian National Association of Mayors of Venezuela (Asociacion Nacional Bolivariana de Alcaldes de Venezuela).  That same year, he supported the candidacy of Hugo Chávez.  In the October 2004 regional elections, Gimenez was elected governor of Yaracuy, beating the incumbent anti-Chavez governor, Eduardo Lapi.

References

1959 births
Governors of Yaracuy
People from Yaracuy
Living people
For Social Democracy politicians
Impeached governors removed from office